On October 10, 1898 a French military expedition commanded by the Lieutenant de vaisseau Henri Bretonnet and the Lt. Solomon Braun left France directed to Chad, at the time dominated by the Muslim warlord Rabih az-Zubayr. With the missions were the envoys of the Muslim rulers Mohammed al-Senoussi and Abd ar Rahman Gwaranga, sultan of Baguirmi, whom captain Émile Gentil had brought to France a few months earlier.

Shortly after Bretonnet's departure, news arrived that Rabih was attacking Baguirmi to punish it for its alliance with France; as a result, Bretonnet was ordered to reach the high course of the Ubangi River, and there unite with the Baguirmians and wait for instructions and reinforcements.

Passing first by the Congo River and then by the lands controlled by Mohammed al-Senoussi, Bretonnet reached on June 15 the French post of Kouno and met with the king of Baguirmi Gaourang. He wrote on July 8, 1899, a letter to Emile Gentil, that headed another expedition proceeding shortly behind, in which he wrote that he did not trust the rumours that Rabih in person was marching on Kouno, but all the same asked Gentil to send him Captain Julien with his 130-strong company.

Even when Bretonnet was forced to admit that Rabih was pointing to Kouno, he grossly underestimated the strength of Rabih, claiming in one of his last letters that he only had out-of-date muskets. Instead Rabih had, in Gentil's opinion, a thousand repeating rifles, 500 muzzle-loading rifles and at least 1500 other firearms.

When Rabih arrived at Kouno on July 16, he could count on 2,700 rifles and 10,000 auxiliaries armed with lances and bows. Against them the Bretonnet mission was no match: it consisted of five Frenchmen (the officers Bretonnet, Braun, Durand-Autier, Martin), 44 Senegalese tirailleurs, two Arabs, 20 armed Bakongos, 3 cannons and 400 Baguirmians led by Abd ar Rahman Gwaranga.

Bretonnet chose to evacuate Kouno and position himself at the nearby hills of Togbao, using the slopes to strengthen his defensive position. On the morning of the next day, July 17, Rabih attacked at 8:00; the first attack was repulsed, but Solomon Braun was killed and Bretonnet wounded so badly he was forced to cede command to lieutenant Durand-Autier. While the second attack was also repulsed, it subjected the Baguirmians to heavy pressure, who began to flee their positions; at this point the third and last assault came, which completely annihilated Bretonnet's column. Gwaranga saved himself fleeing, but not before being wounded, with other Baguirmians.

Of Bretonnet's mission only three Senegalese survived, who were made prisoners and brought for questioning to Rabih. Bretonnet's three cannons were captured, although they were recovered by the French a year later, during the battle of Kousséri. One of the prisoners, the sergeant Samba Sall, escaped a few days later and reached the village of Gaoura, where on 16 August he met the Gentil Mission, and informed them of the disaster.

The victory was to prove hollow for Rabih, for it only strengthened French determination to remove Rabih. Three distinct expeditions marched to southern Chad in 1900, and met at Kousséri to confront Rabih. This was the battle of Kousséri in which Rabih was killed and French possession of Chad guaranteed.

References

Togbao
Togbao 1899
Togbao 1899
1898 in France
1899 in France
19th century in Chad
1899 in Africa